Bruno Bianco Leal (born 9 January 1982) is a Brazilian attorney and politician who served as the Attorney General of Brazil in the Bolsonaro administration from August 2021 to December 2022. Also known as "Mickey da Previdência" ("Social security Mickey Mouse").

References

1982 births
Living people
People from São Paulo
21st-century Brazilian lawyers
Attorneys General of Brazil